Lactarius adustus is a member of the large milk-cap genus Lactarius in the order Russulales. The species was first described in 1938 by Johannes Rick.

See also 
 List of Lactarius species

References

External links 
 

adustus
Fungi described in 1938